John Archibald Wheeler (July 9, 1911April 13, 2008) was an American theoretical physicist. He was largely responsible for reviving interest in general relativity in the United States after World War II. Wheeler also worked with Niels Bohr in explaining the basic principles behind nuclear fission. Together with Gregory Breit, Wheeler developed the concept of the Breit–Wheeler process. He is best known for popularizing the term "black hole," as to objects with gravitational collapse already predicted during the early 20th century, for inventing the terms "quantum foam", "neutron moderator", "wormhole" and "it from bit", and for hypothesizing the "one-electron universe". Stephen Hawking referred to him as the "hero of the black hole story".

Wheeler earned his doctorate at Johns Hopkins University under the supervision of Karl Herzfeld, and studied under Breit and Bohr on a National Research Council fellowship. During 1939 he collaborated with Bohr to write a series of papers using the liquid drop model to explain the mechanism of fission. During World War II, he worked with the Manhattan Project's Metallurgical Laboratory in Chicago, where he helped design nuclear reactors, and then at the Hanford Site in Richland, Washington, where he helped DuPont build them. He returned to Princeton after the war ended, but returned to government service to help design and build the hydrogen bomb in the early 1950s.

For most of his career, Wheeler was a professor of physics at Princeton University, which he joined in 1938, remaining there until 1976. At Princeton he supervised 46 PhD students, more than any other professor in the Princeton physics department.

Wheeler left Princeton University in 1976 at the age of 65. He was appointed as the director of the Center for Theoretical Physics at the University of Texas at Austin in 1976 and remained in the position until 1986, when he retired and became a professor emeritus.

Early life and education 
Wheeler was born in Jacksonville, Florida on July 9, 1911, to librarians Joseph Lewis Wheeler and Mabel Archibald (Archie) Wheeler. He was the oldest of four children, having two younger brothers, Joseph and Robert, and a younger sister, Mary. Joseph earned a PhD from Brown University and a Master of Library Science from Columbia University. Robert earned a PhD in geology from Harvard University and worked as a geologist for oil companies and several colleges. Mary studied library science at the University of Denver and became a librarian. They grew up in Youngstown, Ohio, but spent a year in 1921 to 1922 on a farm in Benson, Vermont, where Wheeler attended a one-room school. After they returned to Youngstown he attended Rayen High School.

After graduating from the Baltimore City College high school in 1926, Wheeler entered Johns Hopkins University with a scholarship from the state of Maryland. He published his first scientific paper in 1930, as part of a summer job at the National Bureau of Standards. He earned his doctorate in 1933. His dissertation research work, carried out under the supervision of Karl Herzfeld, was on the "Theory of the Dispersion and Absorption of Helium". He received a National Research Council fellowship, which he used to study under Gregory Breit at New York University in 1933 and 1934, and then in Copenhagen under Niels Bohr in 1934 and 1935. In a 1934 paper, Breit and Wheeler introduced the Breit–Wheeler process, a mechanism by which photons can be potentially transformed into matter in the form of electron-positron pairs.

Early career 
The University of North Carolina at Chapel Hill made Wheeler an associate professor in 1937, but he wanted to be able to work more closely with the experts in particle physics. He turned down an offer in 1938 of an associate professorship at Johns Hopkins University in favor of an assistant professorship at Princeton University. Although it was a lesser position, he felt that Princeton, which was building up its physics department, was a better career choice. He remained a member of the faculty there until 1976.

In a 1937 paper "On the Mathematical Description of Light Nuclei by the Method of Resonating Group Structure", Wheeler introduced the S-matrix – short for scattering matrix – "a unitary matrix of coefficients connecting the asymptotic behavior of an arbitrary particular solution [of the integral equations] with that of solutions of a standard form". Werner Heisenberg subsequently developed the idea of the S-matrix in the 1940s. Due to the problematic divergences present in quantum field theory at that time, Heisenberg was motivated to isolate the essential features of the theory that would not be affected by future changes as the theory developed. In doing so he was led to introduce a unitary "characteristic" S-matrix, which became an important tool in particle physics.

Wheeler did not develop the S-matrix, but joined Edward Teller in examining Bohr's liquid drop model of the atomic nucleus. They presented their results at a meeting of the American Physical Society in New York in 1938. Wheeler's Chapel Hill graduate student Katharine Way also presented a paper, which she followed up in a subsequent article, detailing how the liquid drop model was unstable under certain conditions. Due to a limitation of the liquid drop model, they all missed the opportunity to predict nuclear fission. The news of Lise Meitner and Otto Frisch's discovery of fission was brought to America by Bohr in 1939. Bohr told Leon Rosenfeld, who informed Wheeler.

Bohr and Wheeler set to work applying the liquid drop model to explain the mechanism of nuclear fission. As the experimental physicists studied fission, they uncovered puzzling results. George Placzek asked Bohr why uranium seemed to fission with both very fast and very slow neutrons. Walking to a meeting with Wheeler, Bohr had an insight that the fission at low energies was due to the uranium-235 isotope, while at high energies it was mainly due to the far more abundant uranium-238 isotope. They co-wrote two more papers on fission. Their first paper appeared in Physical Review on September 1, 1939, the day Germany invaded Poland, starting World War II in Europe.

Considering the notion that positrons were electrons that were traveling backwards in time, he came up in 1940 with his one-electron universe postulate: that there was in fact only one electron, bouncing back and forth in time. Richard Feynman, his graduate student, found this hard to believe, but the idea that positrons were electrons traveling backwards in time intrigued him and Feynman incorporated the notion of the reversibility of time into his Feynman diagrams.

Nuclear weapons

Manhattan Project 
Soon after the Japanese bombing of Pearl Harbor brought the United States into World War II, Wheeler accepted a request from Arthur Compton to join the Manhattan Project's Metallurgical Laboratory at the University of Chicago. He moved there in January 1942, joining Eugene Wigner's group, which was studying nuclear reactor design. He co-wrote a paper with Robert F. Christy on "Chain Reaction of Pure Fissionable Materials in Solution", which was important in the plutonium purification process. It would not be declassified until December 1955. He gave the neutron moderator its name, replacing the term "slower downer" used by Enrico Fermi.

After the United States Army Corps of Engineers took over the Manhattan Project, it gave responsibility for the detailed design and construction of the reactors to DuPont. Wheeler became part of the DuPont design staff. He worked closely with its engineers, commuting between Chicago and Wilmington, Delaware, where DuPont had its headquarters. He moved his family to Wilmington in March 1943. DuPont's task was not just to build nuclear reactors, but an entire plutonium production complex at the Hanford Site in Washington. As work progressed, Wheeler relocated his family again in July 1944, this time to Richland, Washington, where he worked in the scientific buildings known as the 300 area.

Even before the Hanford Site started up the B Reactor, the first of its three reactors, on September 15, 1944, Wheeler had been concerned that some nuclear fission products might turn out to be nuclear poisons, the accumulation of which would impede the ongoing nuclear chain reaction by absorbing many of the thermal neutrons that were needed to continue a chain reaction. In an April 1942 report, he predicted that this would reduce the reactivity by less than one percent so long as no fission product had a neutron capture cross section of more than 100,000 barns. After the reactor unexpectedly shut down, and then just as unexpectedly restarted about fifteen hours later, he suspected iodine-135, with a half life of 6.6 hours, and its daughter product, xenon-135, which has a half life of 9.2 hours. Xenon-135 turned out to have a neutron capture cross-section of well over 2 million barns. The problem was corrected by adding additional fuel slugs to burn out the poison.

Wheeler had a personal reason for working on the Manhattan Project. His brother Joe, fighting in Italy, sent him a postcard with a simple message: "Hurry up". It was already too late: Joe was killed in October 1944. "Here we were,"  Wheeler later wrote, "so close to creating a nuclear weapon to end the war. I couldn't stop thinking then, and haven't stopped thinking since, that the war could have been over in October 1944." Joe left a widow and baby daughter, Mary Jo, who later married physicist James Hartle.

Hydrogen bomb 
In August 1945 Wheeler and his family returned to Princeton, where he resumed his academic career. Working with Feynman, he explored the possibility of physics with particles, but not fields, and carried out theoretical studies of the muon with Jayme Tiomno, resulting in a series of papers on the topic, including a 1949 paper in which Tiomno and Wheeler introduced the "Tiomno Triangle", which related different forms of radioactive decay. He also suggested the use of muons as a nuclear probe. This paper, written and privately circulated in 1949 but not published until 1953, resulted in a series of measurements of the Chang radiation emitted by muons. Muons are a component of cosmic rays, and Wheeler became the founder and first director of Princeton's Cosmic Rays Laboratory, which received a substantial grant of $375,000 from the Office of Naval Research in 1948.  He received a Guggenheim Fellowship in 1946, which allowed him to spend the 1949–50 academic year in Paris.

The 1949 detonation of Joe-1 by the Soviet Union prompted an all-out effort by the United States, led by Teller, to develop the more powerful hydrogen bomb in response. Henry D. Smyth, Wheeler's department head at Princeton, asked him to join the effort. Most physicists were, like Wheeler, trying to re-establish careers interrupted by the war and were reluctant to face more disruption. Others had moral objections. Those who agreed to participate included Emil Konopinski, Marshall Rosenbluth, Lothar Nordheim and Charles Critchfield, but there was also now a body of experienced weapons physicists at the Los Alamos Laboratory, led by Norris Bradbury. Wheeler agreed to go to Los Alamos after a conversation with Bohr. Two of his graduate students from Princeton, Ken Ford and John Toll, joined him there.

At Los Alamos, Wheeler and his family moved into the house on "Bathtub Row" that had been occupied by Robert Oppenheimer and his family during the war. In 1950 there was no practical design for a hydrogen bomb. Calculations by Stanisław Ulam and others showed that Teller's "Classical Super" would not work. Teller and Wheeler created a new design known as "Alarm Clock", but it was not a true thermonuclear weapon. Not until January 1951 did Ulam come up with a workable design.

In 1951 Wheeler obtained permission from Bradbury to set up a branch office of the Los Alamos laboratory at Princeton, known as Project Matterhorn, which had two parts. Matterhorn S (for stellarator, another name coined by Wheeler), under Lyman Spitzer, investigated nuclear fusion as a power source. Matterhorn B (for bomb), under Wheeler, engaged in nuclear weapons research. Senior scientists remained uninterested and aloof from the project, so he staffed it with young graduate and post-doctoral students. Matterhorn B's efforts were crowned by the success of the Ivy Mike nuclear test at Enewetak Atoll in the Pacific, on November 1, 1952, which Wheeler witnessed.

In January 1953 he was involved in a security breach when he lost a highly classified paper on lithium-6 and the hydrogen bomb design during an overnight train trip.  This resulted in Wheeler being given an official reprimand.

Matterhorn B was discontinued, but Matterhorn S endures as the Princeton Plasma Physics Laboratory.

Later career in academia
After concluding his Matterhorn Project work, Wheeler resumed his academic career. In a 1955 paper, he theoretically investigated the geon, an electromagnetic or gravitational wave that is held together in a confined region by the attraction of its own field. He coined the name as a contraction of "gravitational electromagnetic entity". He found that the smallest geon was a toroid the size of the Sun, but millions of times heavier.

Geometrodynamics
During the 1950s, Wheeler formulated geometrodynamics, a program of physical and ontological reduction of every physical phenomenon, such as gravitation and electromagnetism, to the geometrical properties of a curved space-time. His research on the subject was published in 1957 and 1961. Wheeler envisaged the fabric of the universe as a chaotic sub-atomic realm of quantum fluctuations, which he called "quantum foam".

General relativity
General relativity had been considered a less respectable field of physics, being detached from experiment. Wheeler was a key figure in the revival of the subject, leading the school at Princeton University, while Dennis William Sciama and Yakov Borisovich Zel'dovich developed the subject at Cambridge University and the University of Moscow, respectively. Wheeler and his students made substantial contributions to the field during the Golden Age of General Relativity.

While working on mathematical extensions to Einstein's general relativity in 1957, Wheeler introduced the concept and word wormhole to describe hypothetical "tunnels" in space-time. Bohr asked if they were stable and further research by Wheeler determined that they are not. His work in general relativity included the theory of gravitational collapse.  He used the term black hole in 1967 during a talk he gave at the NASA Goddard Institute of Space Studies (GISS), although the term had been used earlier in the decade. Wheeler said the term was suggested to him during a lecture when a member of the audience was tired of hearing Wheeler say "gravitationally completely collapsed object". Wheeler was also a pioneer in the field of quantum gravity due to his development, with Bryce DeWitt, of the Wheeler–DeWitt equation in 1967. Stephen Hawking later described Wheeler and DeWitt's work as the equation governing the "wave function of the Universe".

Quantum information 
Wheeler left Princeton University in 1976 at the age of 65. He was appointed as the director of the Center for Theoretical Physics at the University of Texas at Austin in 1976 and remained in the position until 1986, when he retired and became a professor emeritus.  Misner, Thorne and Wojciech Zurek, all former students of Wheeler, wrote that:

Wheeler's delayed choice experiment is actually several thought experiments in quantum physics that he proposed, with the most prominent among them appearing in 1978 and 1984. These experiments are attempts to decide whether light somehow "senses" the experimental apparatus in the double-slit experiment that it will travel through, and adjusts its behavior to fit by assuming the appropriate determinate state, or whether light remains in an indeterminate state, neither wave nor particle, and responds to the "questions" asked of it in either a wave-consistent manner or a particle-consistent manner, depending on the experimental arrangements that ask these "questions".

Teaching
Wheeler's graduate students included Jacob Bekenstein, Hugh Everett, Richard Feynman, David Hill, Bei-Lok Hu, John R. Klauder, Charles Misner, Kip Thorne, William Unruh, Robert M. Wald, Katharine Way, and Arthur Wightman. Wheeler gave a high priority to teaching, and continued to teach freshman and sophomore physics, saying that the young minds were the most important. At Princeton he supervised 46 PhDs, more than any other professor in the Princeton physics department. With Kent Harrison, Kip Thorne and Masami Wakano, Wheeler wrote Gravitation Theory and Gravitational Collapse (1965). This led to the voluminous general relativity textbook Gravitation (1973), co-written with Misner and Thorne. Its timely appearance during the golden age of general relativity and its comprehensiveness made it an influential relativity textbook for a generation. Wheeler teamed up with Edwin F. Taylor to write Spacetime Physics (1966) and Scouting Black Holes (1996).

Alluding to Wheeler's "mass without mass", the festschrift honoring his 60th birthday was titled Magic Without Magic: John Archibald Wheeler: A Collection of Essays in Honor of his Sixtieth Birthday (1972). His writing style could also attract parodies, including one by "John Archibald Wyler" that was affectionately published by a relativity journal.

Participatory Anthropic Principle 
Wheeler speculated that reality is created by observers in the universe. "How does something arise from nothing?", he asked about the existence of space and time. He also coined the term "Participatory Anthropic Principle" (PAP), a version of a Strong Anthropic Principle.

In 1990, Wheeler suggested that information is fundamental to the physics of the universe. According to this "it from bit" doctrine, all things physical are information-theoretic in origin:

In developing the Participatory Anthropic Principle (PAP), an interpretation of quantum mechanics, Wheeler used a variant on Twenty Questions, called Negative Twenty Questions, to show how the questions we choose to ask about the universe may dictate the answers we get. In this variant, the respondent does not choose or decide upon any particular or definite object beforehand, but only on a pattern of "Yes" or "No" answers. This variant requires the respondent to provide a consistent set of answers to successive questions, so that each answer can be viewed as logically compatible with all the previous answers. In this way, successive questions narrow the options until the questioner settles upon a definite object. Wheeler's theory was that, in an analogous manner, consciousness may play some role in bringing the universe into existence.

From a transcript of a radio interview on "The Anthropic Universe":

Opposition to parapsychology
In 1979, Wheeler spoke to the American Association for the Advancement of Science (AAAS), asking it to expel parapsychology, which had been admitted ten years earlier at the request of Margaret Mead. He called it a pseudoscience, saying he did not oppose earnest research into the questions, but he thought the "air of legitimacy" of being an AAAS-Affiliate should be reserved until convincing tests of at least a few so-called psi effects could be demonstrated. In the question and answer period following his presentation "Not consciousness, but the distinction between the probe and the probed, as central to the elemental quantum act of observation", Wheeler incorrectly stated that J. B. Rhine had committed fraud as a student, for which he apologized in a subsequent letter to the journal Science.  His request was turned down and the Parapsychological Association remained a member of the AAAS.

Personal life 
For 72 years, Wheeler was married to Janette Hegner, a teacher and social worker. They became engaged on their third date, but agreed to defer marriage until after he returned from Europe. They were married on June 10, 1935, five days after his return. Employment was difficult to obtain during the Great Depression. Arthur Ruark offered Wheeler a position as an assistant professor at the University of North Carolina at Chapel Hill, at an annual salary of $2,300, which was less than the $2,400 Janette was offered to teach at the Rye Country Day School. They had three children: Letitia, James English and Alison Wheeler.

Wheeler and Hegner were founding members of the Unitarian Church of Princeton, and she initiated the Friends of the Princeton Public Library. In their later years, Hegner accompanied him on sabbaticals in France, Los Alamos, New Mexico, the Netherlands, and Japan. Hegner died in October 2007 at the age of 96.

Death and legacy 
Wheeler won numerous prizes and awards, including the Golden Plate Award of the American Academy of Achievement in 1966, the Enrico Fermi Award in 1968, the Franklin Medal in 1969, the Einstein Prize in 1969, the National Medal of Science in 1971, the Niels Bohr International Gold Medal in 1982, the Oersted Medal in 1983, the J. Robert Oppenheimer Memorial Prize in 1984 and the Wolf Foundation Prize in 1997. He was a member of the American Philosophical Society, the Royal Academy, the Accademia Nazionale dei Lincei, and the Century Association. He received honorary degrees from 18 different institutions. In 2001, Princeton used a $3 million gift to establish the John Archibald Wheeler/Battelle Professorship in Physics. After his death, the University of Texas named the John A. Wheeler Lecture Hall in his honor.

On April 13, 2008, Wheeler died of pneumonia at the age of 96 in Hightstown, New Jersey.

Bibliography 
 
 
 
 
 
 
 
 
 
  Description & arrow/scrollable preview.

Notes

References

Sources

External links 

 1965 Audio Interview with John Wheeler by Stephane Groueff, Voices of the Manhattan Project
 1986 Audio Interview with John Wheeler by S. L. Sanger, Voices of the Manhattan Project
 A Collection of John Archibald Wheeler's Published and Unpublished Works
 Wheeler's Classic Delayed Choice Experiment
 
 
 Cosmic Search Vol. 1 No. 4, FORUM: John A. Wheeler
 John Wheeler telling his life story at Web of Stories
 Wheeler —Biographical stories 
 John Archibald Wheeler: A Study of Mentoring in Modern Physics
 Kip S. Thorne, "John A. Wheeler", Biographical Memoirs of the National Academy of Sciences (2019)

American nuclear physicists
Particle physicists
American relativity theorists
1911 births
2008 deaths
Albert Einstein Medal recipients
Critics of parapsychology
Enrico Fermi Award recipients
Manhattan Project people
Foreign Members of the Royal Society
Fellows of the American Physical Society
Members of JASON (advisory group)
National Medal of Science laureates
Niels Bohr International Gold Medal recipients
Wolf Prize in Physics laureates
Princeton University faculty
University of North Carolina at Chapel Hill faculty
Baltimore City College alumni
Johns Hopkins University alumni
New York University alumni
Deaths from pneumonia in New Jersey
People from Hightstown, New Jersey
People from Jacksonville, Florida
20th-century American physicists
Recipients of the Matteucci Medal
Presidents of the American Physical Society